The Swaziland National Trust Commission (SNTC) is the custodian of Eswatini's cultural and natural heritage. It is governed by The National Trust Commission Act of 1972. It is a parastatal of the Ministry of Tourism and Environmental Affairs.

Nature
It is responsible for Hawane Nature Reserve, Malolotja Nature Reserve, Mantenga Nature Reserve and Mlawula Nature Reserve.

Culture
It operates the Swaziland National Museum and Mantenga Swazi Cultural Village.

National Monuments
Three sites have been proclaimed National Monuments and a number of further sites are being investigated with a view to future proclamation.

References

External links
Official website of the Swaziland National Trust Commission

National Trust Commission